Heterostomus curvipalpis is a species of fly of the family Xylophagidae. It has a reddish-brown pupa with black spines.

Distribution
Chile.

References

Xylophagidae
Taxa named by Jacques-Marie-Frangile Bigot
Insects described in 1857
Diptera of South America
Endemic fauna of Chile